Nielles-lès-Ardres (literally Nielles near Ardres) is a commune in the Pas-de-Calais department in the Hauts-de-France region of France.

Geography
Nielles-lès-Ardres lies about 14 miles (22 km) northwest of Saint-Omer, on the D225E road.

Population

Places of interest
 The church of St. Pierre, dating from the year 1200.
 Ruins of  the château de la Montoire, destroyed by the duc de Vendôme in 1542.
 Château de la Cressonnerie, built between 1808/1812.
 The seventeenth century ‘Le Colombier’, an enormous round tower.

See also
Communes of the Pas-de-Calais department

References

Nielleslesardres